The 4th Regiment, Tennessee Infantry is an infantry regiment from Tennessee that served in the Confederate States Army. Notable battles that this regiment was engaged in include the Battle of Shiloh.

See also

List of Tennessee Confederate Civil War units

References

4th Tennessee Infantry Regiment
4th Tennessee Infantry Regiment
4th Tennessee Infantry Regiment